Kfar HaHoresh is a Neolithic archaeological site near the kibbutz of the same name in the Jezreel Valley, Israel.  Excavations by Nigel Goring-Morris  of the Hebrew University of Jerusalem were started in the early 1990s. According to Goring-Morris, the site is a "regional funerary and cult centre" dating to the Pre-Pottery Neolithic B period.

References

1990s archaeological discoveries
Neolithic sites of Asia
Prehistoric sites in Israel
Pre-Pottery Neolithic B